Roseland is a musical partnership between Azam Ali and film composer Tyler Bates.  It features Azam singing entirely in English against a rock/ambient soundscape that, on several tracks, includes the drumming and percussion of Greg Ellis, who co-founded Vas with Azam Ali back in 1996.

History and Roseland (album)
Azam and Tyler first met in 2000 when Azam performed on the score for the film "Night at the Golden Eagle." The duo worked together on the soundtracks of 300 and Dawn of the Dead. Eventually, feeling an immediate visceral inspiration during their sessions together, the two collaborated and began work in 2003, which would lead to Roseland.
After almost four years in the making Roseland released their first and so far only album, self-titled, Roseland. The album featured Tyler Bates on electric, acoustic, and bass guitars; keyboards, arrangements and programming. Azam Ali, other than vocals, is also featured on Persian santur (hammered dulcimer), which she had been taught under the guidance of Persian master Manoochehr Sadeghi. Greg Ellis, Azam's partner on Vas, performed on drum kit and percussions for the tracks "Other Side Of Me", "Keep It Coming", "Bitter Days" and "Light The Stars."
The album was originally available on CDBaby.net, but six months later it became out of print (reasons remain unknown). It may still be found through various sellers on the internet.

Reception
Roseland has been noted to stray from both artists' general work as it sways Azam in a more Rock-oriented direction, while it takes Tyler on exploration of ambient electronic techniques. The lyrics were noted for their haunting and evocative reflections on the sorrows of war, self-doubt, and personal experiences and relationships, which shape and mold psyches.

Roseland track listing and album information

See also
Azam Ali
Tyler Bates

References

External links
 Azam Ali's official web-site
 Tyler Bates's official web-site
 Roseland on The Ectophiles' Guide to Good Music

Iranian indie rock groups
American indie rock groups
American world music groups
Musical groups established in 2003